American people of North American descent  refers to inhabitants of the United States with lineage tracing to other North American countries.

American people of North American descent include:

 Canadian Americans
 Mexican Americans
 Caribbean Americans
 Stateside Puerto Ricans
 Cuban Americans
 Haitian Americans